Oxford Tower (formerly known as City Centre Place) is an office tower in Edmonton, Alberta, Canada. It stands at 103 metres (378 feet) and 27 stories tall and was completed in 1974. It was designed by the prolific architecture firm Skidmore, Owings & Merrill.

See also
List of tallest buildings in Edmonton

References

External links
 Oxford Tower Emporis profile

Skyscraper office buildings in Canada
Buildings and structures in Edmonton
Skyscrapers in Edmonton
Towers in Alberta
Oxford Properties
Office buildings completed in 1974

Skidmore, Owings & Merrill buildings